Quadrat Elahi Rahman Shafique (1 November 1962 – 25 February 2009) was a Colonel in the Bangladesh Army who died in the 2009 Bangladesh Rifles mutiny.

Early life 
Shafique was born on 1 November 1962 in Rangpur District, East Pakistan, Pakistan. His father Habibur Rahman was a former Secretary of the Government of Bangladesh, and mother Rokeya Rahman was a teacher at Viqarunnisa Noon School and College. He graduated from Jhenaidah Cadet College and joined Bangladesh Military Academy.

Career 
Shafique was commissioned as an officer in Bangladesh Army on 10 June 1983. He completed his bachelor's degree from the University of Chittagong. He was initially posted in the 3rd East Bengal Regiment.

Shafique worked as an instructor in the School of Infantry and Tactics of Bangladesh Army in Sylhet District. He completed an MBA degree from Institute of Business Administration, University of Dhaka in 1994. He came first in his class.

Shafique had served a year in the United Nations Mission in Bosnia and Herzegovina. He served as the Brigade Major in Bandarban Cantonment in 1995. From 1997 to 1998, he completed his PSC from Defence Services Command and Staff College. He served as the Second in Command of 1st Bengal Infantry Regiment based in Sylhet.

After the creation of Military Institute of Science and Technology, Shafique was assigned the duty to design the schools MBA program. Afterwards he was appointed the Commanding Officer of the 18 Bengal Regiment based in Chittagong Hill Tracts.

Shafique was then posted at Defence Services Command and Staff College and promoted to senior instructor and colonel after two years of teaching on 7 August 2005. He served as sector commander in Juba in 2007 in the United Nations Mission in Sudan and received a gallantry award from the United Nations. Next year, he started on his National Defence College course and completed it in December and at the same completed a master's degree in philosophy from the University of Dhaka.

Shafique was appointed the Sector Commander of Bangladesh Rifles in Dinajpur District in January 2009.

Personal life 
Shafique was married to celebrity chef, Lobbi Rahman. Their son, Saquib Rahman is a Senior Lecturer at the Department of Law in North South University. Shafique was also the nephew of the former President of Bangladesh, late Lieutenant General Hussain Muhammad Ershad (Retd).

Death 
Shafique had arrived for the darbar (conference of all sector commanders) in the Bangladesh Rifles headquarters. He was killed on 25 February 2009 by Bangladesh Rifles mutineers during the Bangladesh Rifles revolt. Shaheed Colonel Quadrat Elahi Public School in Dinajpur was named after him.

References 

1962 births
2009 deaths
People from Rangpur District
University of Dhaka alumni
University of Chittagong alumni
National Defence College (Bangladesh) alumni